Sally Taylor MBE is an English journalist and presenter, best known for presenting BBC South Today.

She attended The Abbey School, Reading, an independent school.

Before beginning her career as a presenter and journalist, she was an English teacher at Winstanley Community College, Leicester.

She has presented South Today, the flagship news programme of BBC South, since 1987.
Taylor also writes a weekly column in the Southern Daily Echo. She had a Saturday morning show on Radio Solent for many years until February 2011.

In 2003, Taylor successfully filled in when weather presenter Dorcas Henry collapsed live on air.

Taylor hosted The Spending Review, The South Today Debate on BBC One with Naga Munchetty on 9 September 2010.

She was awarded the MBE (Member of the Order of the British Empire) in the 2005 Queen's Birthday Honours List for her services to regional broadcasting. 
In October 2015, she was awarded an Honorary Doctor of Letters degree in recognition of her work in broadcasting and with local charities by the University of Winchester. She is described as a "top notch journalist and someone you can trust to tell you the news without fear or favour" 

Taylor appeared in The Vagina Monologues during its UK run at Southampton's Mayflower Theatre in 2010.

References

External links
 in BBC - South Today - Presenters - Profile
 Radio Solent
 Daily Echo article

BBC newsreaders and journalists
People from Reading, Berkshire
Living people
People educated at The Abbey School
Members of the Order of the British Empire
Year of birth missing (living people)